Raimundo da Mota de Azevedo Correia (May 13, 1859 – September 13, 1911) was a Brazilian Parnassian poet, judge and magistrate. Alongside Alberto de Oliveira and Olavo Bilac, he was a member of the "Parnassian Triad".

He founded and occupied the 5th chair of the Brazilian Academy of Letters from 1897 until his death in 1911.

Life
Correia was born on a ship anchored in the shores of São Luís, Maranhão, to desembargador José da Mota de Azevedo Correia and Maria Clara Vieira da Mota de Azevedo Correia. Correia made his secondary course at the Colégio Pedro II, and graduated in Law in 1882, at the Faculdade de Direito da Universidade de São Paulo. He would serve as a successful judge in Rio de Janeiro and Minas Gerais.

Correia's first book, Primeiros Sonhos, was published in 1879, and its poems have a strong influence of Brazilian Romantic poets such as Fagundes Varela, Casimiro de Abreu and Castro Alves. However, he would join Parnassianism in 1883, with him book Sinfonias. Some of his poems are also considered to forerun the Symbolist movement in Brazil.

Correia died in 1911 in Paris while he was searching for a treatment for his diseases.

Bibliography
 Primeiros Sonhos (1879)
 Sinfonias (1883)
 Versos e Versões (1887)
 Aleluias (1891)
 Poesias (1898)

References
Footnotes

Sources

External links

 Raimundo Correia's biography at the official site of the Brazilian Academy of Letters 
 

1859 births
1911 deaths
19th-century Brazilian poets
Brazilian male poets
20th-century Brazilian judges
Brazilian people of Portuguese descent
People from São Luís, Maranhão
Members of the Brazilian Academy of Letters
University of São Paulo alumni
19th-century Brazilian male writers
19th-century Brazilian judges